Virgil Boekelheide (28 July 1919 – 24 September 2003) was an American organic chemist and a professor in the department of chemistry at the University of Oregon. He is known for his work on aromatic compounds, particularly cyclophanes, and a name reaction, the Boekelheide reaction, is named after him.

Education and academic career
Boekelheide was born in Chelsea, South Dakota to a family of German ancestry. He received his bachelor's degree from Dakota Wesleyan University in 1939. He then received his PhD from the University of Minnesota in 1943, where he worked under the supervision of C. Frederick Koelsch. After three years as an instructor at the University of Illinois, he joined the faculty as a professor at the University of Rochester in 1946. He moved to the University of Oregon in 1960 and remained there for the rest of his research career. He retired in 1984.

Boekelheide was awarded the Guggenheim Fellowship in 1953 and was an Alexander von Humboldt Fellow, permitting him to spend time as a visiting scientist in Germany. He was elected to the United States National Academy of Sciences in 1962.

Research

Boekelheide began his research career studying alkaloid natural products, but later refocused his interests on aromaticity, particularly bridged compounds known as cyclophanes. He was the first to synthesize the sixfold-bridged cyclophane compound known as superphane, a molecule of interest due to its unique pi-stacking intramolecular interactions.

A name reaction, the Boekelheide reaction, is named after him following his publication in 1954.

Personal life
Especially in later life, Boekelheide was a patron of the arts in Eugene, Oregon, serving as president of the Eugene Ballet Society from 1988 to 1991. He and his wife had three children.

References

American chemists
Organic chemists
1919 births
2003 deaths
Members of the United States National Academy of Sciences
Dakota Wesleyan University alumni
University of Minnesota alumni
University of Illinois faculty
University of Rochester faculty
University of Oregon faculty
American expatriates in Germany